Atwood Airport  was located  northeast of Atwood, Ontario, Canada.

See also
Atwood/Coghlin Airport

References

External links
Page about this airport on COPA's Places to Fly airport directory

Defunct airports in Ontario